John George Kemeny (born Kemény János György; May 31, 1926 – December 26, 1992) was a Hungarian-born American mathematician, computer scientist, and educator best known for co-developing the BASIC programming language in 1964 with Thomas E. Kurtz. Kemeny served as the 13th President of Dartmouth College from 1970 to 1981 and pioneered the use of computers in college education. Kemeny chaired the presidential commission that investigated the Three Mile Island accident in 1979. According to György Marx he was one of The Martians.

Early life 
Born in Budapest, Hungary, into a Jewish family, Kemeny attended the Rácz private primary school in Budapest and was a classmate of Nándor Balázs. In 1938 his father left for the United States alone. In 1940, he took the whole Kemeny family to the United States when the adoption of the second anti-Jewish law in Hungary became imminent. His grandfather, however, refused to leave and was murdered in the Holocaust, along with an aunt and uncle. Kemeny's family settled in New York City where he attended George Washington High School. He graduated with the best results in his class three years later. In 1943, Kemeny entered Princeton University where he studied mathematics and philosophy, but he took a year off during his studies to work on the Manhattan Project at Los Alamos National Laboratory, where his boss was Richard Feynman. He also worked there with John von Neumann. Returning to Princeton, Kemeny graduated with an A.B. in mathematics in 1946 after completing a senior thesis, titled "Equivalent logical systems", under the supervision of Alonzo Church. He then remained at Princeton to pursue graduate studies and received a Ph.D. in mathematics in 1949 after completing a doctoral dissertation, titled "Type-theory vs. set-theory", also under the supervision of Alonzo Church. He worked as Albert Einstein's mathematical assistant during graduate school.

Career
Kemeny was appointed to the Dartmouth Mathematics Department as a full professor in 1953, at the age of 27. Two years later he became chairman of the department, and held this post until 1967. 
Kemeny ventured into curriculum development when he introduced Finite mathematics courses. He teamed with Gerald L. Thompson and J. Laurie Snell to write Introduction to Finite Mathematics (1957) for students of biology and social sciences. The Dartmouth mathematics department professors also wrote Finite Mathematical Structures (1959) and Finite Mathematics with Business Applications (1962). Other colleges and universities followed this lead and several more textbooks in Finite Mathematics were composed elsewhere. The topic of Markov chains was particularly popular so Kemeny teamed with J. Laurie Snell to publish Finite Markov Chains (1960) to provide an introductory college textbook. Considering the advances using potential theory obtained by G. A. Hunt, they wrote Denumerable Markov Chains in 1966. This textbook, suitable for advanced seminars, was followed by a second edition in 1976 when an additional chapter on random fields by David Griffeath was included.

Kemeny and Kurtz were pioneers in the use of computers for ordinary people. After early experiments with ALGOL 30 and DOPE on the LGP-30, they invented the BASIC programming language in 1964, as well as one of the world's first time-sharing systems, the Dartmouth Time-Sharing System (DTSS). In 1974, the American Federation of Information Processing Societies gave an award to Kemeny and Kurtz at the National Computer Conference for their work on BASIC and time-sharing. BASIC was the language used in most software written during the rise of the Apple II, the Commodore, the TRS-80, and the IBM PCs throughout the 80s.

Kemeny was president of Dartmouth from 1970 to 1981, and continued to teach undergraduate courses and to do research and publish papers during his time as president. He presided over the coeducation of Dartmouth in 1972. He also instituted the "Dartmouth Plan" of year-round operations, thereby allowing more students without more buildings. During his administration, Dartmouth became more proactive in recruiting and retaining minority students and revived its founding commitment to provide education for American Indians. Kemeny made Dartmouth a pioneer in student use of computers, equating computer literacy with reading literacy. In 1982 he returned to teaching full-time.

In 1983, Kemeny and Kurtz co-founded a company called True BASIC, Inc. to market True BASIC, an updated version of the language.

Death

John Kemeny died at the age of 66, the result of heart failure in Lebanon, New Hampshire on December 26, 1992. He had lived in Etna, near the Dartmouth Campus.

See also
Kemeny–Young method
Kemeny's constant (an invariant sum arising in the study of finite Markov chains).
The Martians (scientists)
New Hampshire Historical Marker No. 261: BASIC: The First User-Friendly Computer Programming Language

References

External links
The Papers of John G. Kemeny in the Dartmouth College Library
Posted in the article with permission from Dartmouth College
Dartmouth Wheelock Succession
Bio at Bellevue C.C. site
A sketch of John Kemeny for the Dartmouth Alumni Magazine

Interview with Kemeny about his experience at Princeton
True Basic Inc. information

1926 births
1992 deaths
Manhattan Project people
American computer scientists
George Washington Educational Campus alumni
Jewish American scientists
Princeton University alumni
Dartmouth College faculty
Presidents of Dartmouth College
BASIC programming language
Programming language designers
People associated with nuclear power
Hungarian emigrants to the United States
Jews who emigrated to escape Nazism
Hungarian Jews
People from Pest, Hungary
Mathematical economists
Mathematics educators
20th-century Hungarian mathematicians
20th-century American academics